Thomas Porter Whitney (January 26, 1917 in Toledo, Ohio – December 2, 2007 in Manhattan, New York) was an American diplomat, author, translator, philanthropist and Thoroughbred racehorse owner/breeder.

Biography
Born in Toledo, Ohio, Whitney graduated from Amherst College with a B.A. degree and went on graduate from Columbia University in 1940 with a Master's degree in Russian history. A translator of a number of works from Russian to English, Whitney is best known for translating the work of Nobel Prize winning author, Aleksandr Solzhenitsyn. Whitney also translated Pyotr Grigorenko's Memoirs and Yuri Orlov's Dangerous Thoughts.

He wrote a memoir titled Russia in My Life. First published in 1962 in New York City, it recounted the nine years he spent living in the Soviet Union at the close of the Joseph Stalin regime.

During World War II, Whitney worked as an analyst for the Office of Strategic Services in Washington, D.C. From 1944 to 1947, he served as an attaché and chief of the economic section at the United States embassy in Moscow. In 1947, he became the Moscow correspondent for The Associated Press and later was appointed head of the Moscow office.

Whitney donated important collections of Russian art and manuscripts to Amherst College, and established a center at the college for Russian studies.

A fan of Thoroughbred racing, as a hobby Whitney owned and raced several horses, most notably winning the Grade 1 Diana Handicap in 1983.

References

1917 births
2007 deaths
Phillips Exeter Academy alumni
Amherst College alumni
Columbia Graduate School of Arts and Sciences alumni
Russian studies scholars
People of the Office of Strategic Services
20th-century American translators
Russian–English translators
20th-century American non-fiction writers
Writers about the Soviet Union
American male journalists
American racehorse owners and breeders
American art collectors
American philanthropists
Writers from Toledo, Ohio
Ambassadors of the United States to the Soviet Union
20th-century American diplomats
Journalists from Ohio
20th-century American journalists
20th-century American male writers